Spy Games is a 2020 American reality competition television series that premiered on January 20, 2020, on Bravo. Hosted by Mia Kang, ten contestants compete for $100,000.

Judges
 Douglas Laux: A former operations officer in the Central Intelligence Agency with nearly a decade of experience. In that capacity, Laux deployed several times to Afghanistan where he helped track and eliminate key terror targets; he was in the country during and after the death of Osama bin Laden. He also built numerous contacts within the country, becoming familiar with the different languages and cultures of Afghanistan. Near the end of his CIA career, Laux was sent to Syria to meet with members of the anti-Assad resistance of the country. In 2016, he published a memoir detailing his time in the CIA (Left of Boom).
 Evy Poumpouras: A former officer in the New York Police Department turned United States Secret Service agent. Poumpouras served on protective details for former President Barack Obama and former First Lady Michelle Obama. She investigated both financial and violent crimes and worked in the Secret Service's elite polygraph unit. She underwent training from the Department of Defense in lie detection, human behavior and cognitive influence. She also protected former Presidents Bill Clinton, George H.W. Bush and George W. Bush. She completed undergraduate studies at Hofstra University and holds graduate degrees from Argosy University and Columbia University Graduate School of Journalism. She is currently a journalist who has worked for CNN, MSNBC, ABC and NBC.
 Erroll Southers: A former FBI agent and scholar of national security. Southers completed undergraduate studies at Brown University and planned on becoming a doctor, but instead opted for a career in law enforcement, first joining the Santa Monica Police Department. He then served for four years in the FBI, working in counterterrorism, counterintelligence and served in SWAT. After leaving the FBI, he was appointed by former Governor of California Arnold Schwarzenegger to serve as the deputy director for critical infrastructure protection in the California Office of Homeland Security. In 2007, he was appointed chief of intelligence and counterterrorism for the Los Angeles World Airports (LAWA) Police Department, the nation's largest law enforcement agency dedicated solely to aviation. He holds a master's degree and PhD from the University of Southern California. He currently serves as a professor at the USC Price School of Public Policy, specializing in national security and how to combat extremism.

Contestants

Contestant progress 

 The contestant received positive critiques and was ultimately declared the Top Performer in the mission by the Assessors
 The contestant was brought in for further interrogation, and remained in the competition
 The contestant was brought in for further interrogation, and dismissed and eliminated from the competition
 The contestant was the runner-up in the competition
 The contestant was the winner in the competition and won the $100,000 prize

Episodes

References

External links
 
 

2020s American reality television series
2020 American television series debuts
English-language television shows
Bravo (American TV network) original programming
2020 American television seasons
Espionage television series